Albert Tatlock is a fictional character on the British television soap opera Coronation Street. Albert was played by actor Jack Howarth from 1960 to 1984.  The character became something of a cultural institution, so much that grumpy old men were sometimes nicknamed "Albert Tatlock".

A veteran of the First World War, Albert settled back into civilian life by marrying and starting a family. However, his wife Bessie died in 1959 and he retired from his job at the Town Hall the following year, before taking up a new occupation as the street's resident grumpy old man, forever complaining about the struggles of old age and living on the low income from his pension.

Although Albert was never close to his daughter Beattie, he maintained close ties with his brother Alfred's family, particularly his niece Valerie, who married Albert's neighbour Ken Barlow in 1962. With Val's death in 1971, and Beattie's continued absence, Ken eventually moved into No. 1 and took care of Albert in his twilight years until his death in May 1984.

Storylines

Albert was delighted when his niece Valerie (Anne Reid), daughter of his brother Alfred, came to stay with him, and began seeing neighbour Ken Barlow (William Roache); Albert was even more delighted when the pair got married in 1962. He was pleased to have family ties in the street, and he was a frequent visitor at No. 9.

Not idle in his retirement, Albert got a job as a school crossing warden and hired an allotment from the Council to grow his own vegetables. In 1965, Albert asked Clara Midgeley (Betty Hardy) to look after his house whilst he made an extended visit to his daughter Beattie Pearson's (Gabrielle Daye), and upon his return he soon realised Clara was interested in him. Clara proposed to Albert, but he turned her down, saying he was too set in his ways.

Money was always a great concern of Albert's, in 1967 he briefly bought items in bulk with Ena Sharples (Violet Carson) to cut costs and later took a live-in assistant job at the Fusiliers' Museum, working for his old friend Harry Dunscombe. Effie Spicer (Anne Dyson) looked after No. 1 while Albert was living elsewhere. Effie left the house abruptly upon Albert's return as he had increased her rent because he hated the decorating she had done as a surprise for him.

In 1969, Albert found himself warming to the idea of remarrying, so he would have someone to spend his old age with. He proposed to Alice Pickins (Doris Hare), who had been pursuing him for nearly a year, however as the guests assembled for the wedding, the vicar was delayed, and Alice thought it was a bad sign and decided not to marry Albert after all. Further upset came for Albert in 1971 when Ken and Valerie decided to emigrate. Just as he was coming to terms with their departure, Valerie died in an accident in the Barlows' maisonette, and a distraught Ken decided to stay in the country. Even though Ken was not a blood relative, Albert had come to accept him as part of his family and eventually let him lodge at No. 1 although he made clear his disapproval that Ken had decided to send his and Val's twins Peter and Susan (Robert and Katie Heaneu) to live in Scotland with Val's parents, Alfred and Edith Tatlock (Clare Kelly).

In the meantime, Albert's financial woes continued. He took a job as co-caretaker at the local Community Centre and in 1973 suggested to friend Minnie Caldwell (Margot Bryant) that they marry for financial reasons (Minnie was also struggling with money). After months of being engaged, Minnie pressed Albert to set a date for the wedding. However, when her friend Ena pointed out that as a couple, they would earn less than they would separately, Minnie called off the engagement. Both were relieved, as they were starting to get on each other's nerves.

Albert celebrated his 80th birthday in August 1975. To his surprise, the neighbours threw a surprise party for him. They had contacted his old regiment who sent along a bugler. In 1976, Albert had a dispute when he won money at the bingo with Bertha Lumley (Madoline Thomas), as she did not share her winnings with him despite their agreement. Albert was threatened by Bertha's husband Nat (Eric Longworth), so he decided to leave well alone.

Albert was very proud of his war record, and took a dim view of Minnie's friend Handel Gartside (Harry Markham) when he found out he was a conscientious objector, and even at one point refused to let Handel in his house. In 1980, Albert sold his Military Medal to go to London for Remembrance Day, to pay tribute to his war friend Monty Shawcross. When Ken saw how upset Albert was that he had sold his medal, he bought it back for him.

In the late 1970s, Albert spent his days taking care of his allotment, though he feared the Council would take it off him because of his age. Ken had married again but was now back at No. 1 after being widowed. However, in 1981, Ken married for a third time, to Deirdre Langton (Anne Kirkbride). Ken and Deirdre planned to move although Ken felt an obligation to take care of Albert, as Albert's daughter Beattie continued to visit him only a few times a year. Albert wanted to stay in No. 1 but knew that if he left the house to Ken and Deirdre in his will it would upset Beattie, so the Barlows decided to buy it from him instead (although Beattie was still upset by the news). Albert agreed to move into the front parlour so that Deirdre's daughter Tracy (Holly Chamarette) could take his room.

Albert Tatlock died of a heart attack whilst sat in his chair at 11am on 14 May 1984, aged 88, while visiting Beattie. His death mirrored the real life death of the actor who played him, Jack Howarth, who had died in hospital six weeks earlier. In 2014, Albert's medal featured in a further storyline, when Tracy sold it. Deirdre was furious and demanded she get it back or else she would kick her out of No. 1.

In January 2019, Ken's long-lost son Daniel Osbourne (Rob Mallard) and his wife Sinead (Katie McGlynn) had a baby boy whom they named Bertie, after Albert.

Creation and development

Personality and identity
To those that did not know him, Albert could be perceived as a very bitter person, as he was constantly complaining about nearly every aspect of his life, and seemed to think that his problems amounted to more than anyone else's, however trivial they were. Although he was never chatty or chirpy, in the 1960s Albert was more accepting of the troubles life threw at him, however as the years went by as Albert became more set in his ways, he became grumpier, sounding off about his problems to anyone who tried to engage him in conversation.

To his family and closest friends, as well as anyone willing to indulge him in recollections of his war stories, Albert showed a softer side. Although a pessimist, he was also nostalgic, and easily grew attached to things that were important to him. Unfortunately, this occasionally manifested itself through stubbornness, especially in family matters, as he tended to think he knew what was best for people and would not hesitate to tell them, even if he knew they disagreed with him. Likewise, when let down by his family, he was prone to feeling sorry for himself until his indignation was validated.

Community involvement
Despite his advancing years, Albert was very active in the community in Coronation Street, acting as Chairman of the Over 60s Club in 1961, organising an Over 60s bazaar in 1964 and a trip to the Preston Guild in 1972.

In 1962, he formed the Mission Hall Players, through which the residents performed in pantomime in Lady Lawson Loses in the Mission, with Albert himself playing the role of Manders. Almost without exception, Albert participated in all subsequent plays performed in the Mission and Community Centre, playing Baron Hardup (panto), the Genie (Aladdin), and Baron (Cinderella), as well as Rob Wilton in a 40s show in the Rovers and reciting "The Girl I Kissed on the Stairs" at a Christmas concert.

Having worked at the Town Hall, Albert was also pressed into action by the residents for several causes, including investigating the possibility of Coronation Street being demolished. He also started a petition to stop the street being renamed. Albert also served the community by working as Caretaker at the Mission after Ena Sharples lost the job in 1961, even though the job required him to move out of his beloved No.1 and into the Mission vestry. He later gave up the job so that Ena could be reinstated.

Family and friends
Albert was closest to those who took the time to visit him. His daughter Beattie rarely did so, usually turning up only when she was needed. Albert did not feel close to her and refused his Doctor's recommendations that he moved in with Beattie and her husband Norman Pearson, as he knew they did not want him and so he would never be at home. Beattie liked to think of herself as the perfect daughter to Albert, and overcompensated for her inactive role in his life during her fleeting visits, such as when she guilted Jerry Booth into paying £5 compensation when Albert was gassed by a faulty cooker fitted by Jerry, Albert having made clear that he did not want compensation.
His best friends in Coronation Street were the Barlow family, who lived next door at No.3. Both Ken and David Barlow were frequent visitors at No.1, with Ken in particular seeking solace in Albert's house when he needed to get away from family pressures. Albert could not have been happier when Ken married his niece, Valerie. After a while, Ken even started to call Albert "Uncle Albert" as Val did. Albert thought of the Barlows as his extended family, and was upset when David married Irma Ogden while he was away, as he had not wanted to miss the wedding.

Ken lived with Albert for periods during the 1970s and from 1976 onwards. As Ken tried to forge a new life after Val's death, Albert was very critical of his decisions, especially those relating to his love life, as he did not think any girl was worthy of following Val. He eventually gave his approval of Ken's overnight marriage to Janet Reid, and he was upset when they separated. It took a long time for Albert to warm to Deirdre Langton, as he resented the fact that she had a daughter from a previous marriage who Ken was spending more time with than his own children, however he later changed his mind and encouraged them to live at No.1 when they got married.

Even over those of his own father Frank Barlow, Ken recalls Albert's words when he recounts the fatherly advice he received in the past. A photograph of Albert remains on the mantelpiece at No.1.

Albert's closest friends in Coronation Street were Rovers landlady Annie Walker and landlord Jack, Mission caretaker Ena Sharples and one-time fiancé Minnie Caldwell. All four friendships lasted decades and they were among the few people who indulged Albert when he was on a tirade.

Hobbies and interests
Albert's main topics of conversation were the war and his allotment. He enjoyed nothing more than talking about old times and especially old battles. In 1968, when he believed the author of a book about the Battle of Lys got his facts wrong, he planned to expose him, until it was discovered that Albert had got lost while out on patrol and missed the battle himself. In 1971, BBC Manchester interviewed Albert about the war.

Albert's allotment provided something to do in his later years. When he feared, the Council was going to take it off him, the neighbours agreed to help out, although he was furious when Ray Langton carved "Albert rules OK" into his marrow. Further, salad from his allotment was the cause of a sickness in the street when it was sold at the Corner Shop in 1978.

Albert was also a cricket fan, and hoped to go see the West Indies team play. A rum drinker, his catch phrases in the "Rovers Return" were "I'll have a rum." and "Eeh by gum."

External links

Coronation Street characters
Television characters introduced in 1960
Male characters in television
Fictional World War I veterans